La Escondida Airport is a high elevation airstrip serving the Minera Escondida copper mines in the Antofagasta Region of Chile.

The runway has an over  upslope to the east. There is rising terrain north and south of the runway.

See also

Transport in Chile
List of airports in Chile

References

External links
OpenStreetMap - La Escondida
OurAirports - La Escondida
FallingRain - La Escondida Airport

Airports in Antofagasta Region